Nichelle Strong (born September 10, 1968), known by her stage name Nikki D is an American rapper.

Career
Strong signed with Def Jam in 1989 and released her debut single "Lettin' Off Steam" the following year. It was produced by Sam Sever. The single's video featured Flavor Flav. In 1991, Strong released the more commercially viable song, "Daddy's Little Girl", which appeared on the Indie film Just Another Girl on the I.R.T. soundtrack, reaching #1 on the US Billboard Hot Rap Singles chart.

Prior to releasing "Daddy's Little Girl", Strong was on tour in Europe for a year with fellow R&B artist Alyson Williams. Strong has recorded songs with Moby, Queen Latifah on the Set It Off soundtrack, with Redman for his Muddy Waters album, EPMD, Naughty By Nature, Flavor Unit and Suzanne Vega.

Discography

Album
 1991: Daddy's Little Girl (Def Jam) - US R&B #54

Singles

References

External links
[ Nikki D discography] at AllMusic

American women rappers
African-American women rappers
Def Jam Recordings artists
Living people
1968 births
21st-century American rappers
21st-century American women musicians
21st-century African-American women
21st-century African-American musicians
20th-century African-American people
20th-century African-American women
21st-century women rappers